"Esperándote" ("Waiting For You") is a song performed by Puerto Rican salsa singer Tito Rojas on his studio album Por Derecho Propio (1995). It was written by Alicia Baroni and released as the lead single from the album. The track was nominated in the category of Tropical Song of the Year at the 8th Annual Lo Nuestro Awards in the same year, ultimately losing to "Abriendo Puertas" by Gloria Estefan. The track was recognized as one of the best-performing songs of the year at the 1996 ASCAP Latin Awards. It became his first number one song on the Tropical Airplay chart.

Charts

Weekly charts

Year-end charts

See also
List of Billboard Tropical Airplay number ones of 1994 and 1995

References

1995 songs
1995 singles
Tito Rojas songs